In abstract algebra, the Pierce–Birkhoff conjecture asserts that any piecewise-polynomial function can be expressed as a maximum of finite minima of finite collections of polynomials. It was first stated, albeit in non-rigorous and vague wording, in the 1956 paper of Garrett Birkhoff and Richard S. Pierce in which they first introduced f-rings. The modern, rigorous statement of the conjecture was formulated by Melvin Henriksen and John R. Isbell, who worked on the problem in the early 1960s in connection with their work on f-rings. Their formulation is as follows:

For every real piecewise-polynomial function , there exists a finite set of polynomials  such that .

Isbell is likely the source of the name Pierce–Birkhoff conjecture, and popularized the problem in the 1980s by discussing it with several mathematicians interested in real algebraic geometry.

The conjecture was proved true for n = 1 and 2 by Louis Mahé.

Local Pierce–Birkhoff conjecture 

References

Further reading 
 
 
 

Conjectures
Real algebraic geometry
Unsolved problems in geometry